The 2012 Cork Premier Intermediate Football Championship was the seventh staging of the Cork Premier Intermediate Football Championship since its establishment by the Cork County Board in 2006. The draw for the opening round fixtures took place on 11 December 2011. The championship began on 5 May 2012 and ended on 28 October 2012.

Newmarket and Grenagh left the championship after their respective promotion and relegation to different grades. Kinsale and Valley Rovers joined the championship. Mayfield were relegated from the championship after being beaten in a playoff by Macroom.

The final was played on 28 October 2012 at Páirc Uí Chaoimh in Cork, between St. Vincent's and St Michael's. St. Vincent's won the match by 0-12 to 0-11 to claim their second championship title in the grade overall and a first title since 2006.

Mallow's Cian O'Riordan was the championship's top scorer with 1-28.

Team changes

To Championship

Promoted from the Cork Intermediate Football Championship
 Kinsale

Relegated from the Cork Senior Football Championship
 Valley Rovers

From Championship

Promoted to the Cork Senior Football Championship
 Newmarket

Relegated to the Cork Intermediate Football Championship
 Grenagh

Results

Round 1

Round 2

Round 3

Relegation playoff

Round 4

Quarter-finals

Semi-finals

Final

Championship statistics

Top scorers

Overall

In a single game

References

Cork Premier Intermediate Football Championship
Cork Premier Senior Football Championship